Nishikiori is a Japanese surname. Notable people and fictional characters with the surname include:

People 
 , Japanese team handball player
 , Japanese director

Fictional characters 
 , a character in the Mazinger series.